Griffith Williams may refer to:

 Griffith Williams (bishop) (c. 1589–1672), Anglican bishop of Ossory
 Sir Griffith Williams, 1st Baronet (died 1663), Sheriff of Carnarvonshire
 Griffith Williams (Gutyn Peris) (1769–1838), Welsh bard

See also
 John Griffith Williams (born 1944), Welsh High Court judge